This article contains information about the literary events and publications of 1962.

Events
January 7 – In an article in The New York Times Book Review, Gore Vidal calls Evelyn Waugh "our time's first satirist".
February 17 – Arthur Miller marries the photographer Inge Morath.
February 28 – F. R. Leavis delivers the Richmond lecture Two Cultures? The Significance of C. P. Snow at Downing College, Cambridge, which arouses controversy.
May 11 – The Finnish Ministry of Education forbids the import and distribution of eight children's books (including Alice's Adventures in Wonderland), published by Kynäbaari, because of the poor quality and clandestine abridgement of the translations.
May – Joe Orton and Kenneth Halliwell are prosecuted and jailed for defacing library books in London.
June 5 – Marvel Comics publishes Amazing Fantasy #15, featuring the debut of its Spider-Man feature by Stan Lee and Steve Ditko. The Amazing Spider-Man periodical series begins publication in December.
June 30 – The works of Pierre Teilhard de Chardin are denounced by the Roman Catholic Church.
July – The General Law Amendment Act in South Africa denies freedom of speech to opposition activists and writers.
September – Ted Hughes and Sylvia Plath separate. From the beginning of the following month, Plath experiences a burst of creativity, writing in the last few months of her life most of the poems on which her reputation will rest. They include many that will appear in Ariel and Winter Trees. On October 31, Heinemann in London publish The Colossus which will be the only collection of her poems published in her lifetime under her own name. In December she moves to a London flat in a house where W. B. Yeats lived as a boy.
November – Aleksandr Solzhenitsyn's novella One Day in the Life of Ivan Denisovich (Odin den' Ivana Denisovicha), the author's semi-autobiographical account of life in the gulag, is published in Novy Mir in an unprecedented acknowledgement of the Soviet Union's Stalinist past.
December – L. Frank Baum's short story "The Tiger's Eye" appears for the first time nearly 60 after it was written.
December 4 – A tape-recorded conversation on science fiction takes place between Kingsley Amis, C. S. Lewis and Brian Aldiss in Lewis's rooms at Cambridge.
unknown dates
Richard Booth opens a second-hand bookshop at the old fire station in the future "bookshop town" of Hay-on-Wye in Wales.
Lynne Reid Banks goes to live in a kibbutz in Israel.
George Oppen publishes his first collection of poetry since Discrete Series in 1934, breaking a 28-year silence. He goes on to win the Pulitzer Prize in 1969.
A parallel text edition of George Bernard Shaw's play Androcles and the Lion is published posthumously by Penguin Books in the UK, as the first published work in the phonetic Shavian alphabet devised by Ronald Kingsley Read.

New books

Fiction
H. G. Adler – Eine Reise (A Journey)
Nelson Algren (editor) – Nelson Algren's Own Book of Lonesome Monsters: 13 Masterpieces of Black Humor (anthology)
 Eric Ambler – The Light of Day
Isaac Asimov, editor – The Hugo Winners
James Baldwin – Another Country
J. G. Ballard – The Drowned World
William Barrett – Lilies of the Field
Giorgio Bassani – The Garden of the Finzi-Continis (Il giardino dei Finzi-Contini)
Thomas Berger – Reinhart in Love
Jorge Luis Borges – Ficciones (The Garden of Forking Paths and Artifices translated by Anthony Bonner)
Ray Bradbury
R is for Rocket
Something Wicked This Way Comes
John Braine – Life at the Top
John Brunner
Secret Agent of Terra
The Super Barbarians
Eugene Burdick and Harvey Wheeler – Fail-Safe
Anthony Burgess
A Clockwork Orange
The Wanting Seed
William S. Burroughs – The Ticket That Exploded
Taylor Caldwell – A Prologue To Love
Alejo Carpentier – El Siglo de las Luces (Age of Enlightenment, translated as Explosion in a Cathedral)
John Dickson Carr – The Demoniacs
Rosario Castellanos – Oficio de tinieblas (The Book of Lamentations)
Agatha Christie – The Mirror Crack'd from Side to Side
James Clavell – King Rat
Lionel Davidson – The Rose of Tibet
Len Deighton – The IPCRESS File
August Derleth
Lonesome Places
The Trail of Cthulhu
August Derleth, editor – Dark Mind, Dark Heart
Philip K. Dick – The Man in the High Castle
Tonke Dragt – De brief voor de Koning (The Letter for the King)
Allen Drury – A Shade of Difference
Richard Gordon – Doctor in the Swim
 Edward Grierson – The Massingham Affair
William Faulkner – The Reivers
Gabriel Fielding – The Birthday King
Ian Fleming – The Spy Who Loved Me
C. S. Forester – Hornblower and the Hotspur
Carlos Fuentes
Aura
The Death of Artemio Cruz
Aldous Huxley – Island
Hammond Innes – Atlantic Fury
Michael Innes – A Connoisseur's Case
Shirley Jackson – We Have Always Lived in the Castle
James Jones – The Thin Red Line
William Melvin Kelley – A Different Drummer
Jack Kerouac – Big Sur
Ken Kesey – One Flew Over the Cuckoo's Nest
Fletcher Knebel and Charles W. Bailey II – Seven Days in May
James Krüss – Timm Thaler
Manuel Mujica Láinez – Bomarzo
Anna Langfus – Les bagages de sable (Bags of Sand)
John le Carré – A Murder of Quality
Doris Lessing – The Golden Notebook
Anne Morrow Lindbergh – Dearly Beloved
H. P. Lovecraft – Dreams and Fancies
Eloise McGraw – The Golden Goblet
Alistair MacLean – The Satan Bug
Gabriel Garcia Marquez – In Evil Hour (La mala hora)
Ngaio Marsh – Hand in Glove
Khadija Mastoor – Aangan (آنگن, Courtyard)
 Gladys Mitchell – My Bones Will Keep
Marcel Moreau – Quintes
Penelope Mortimer – The Pumpkin Eater
Vladimir Nabokov – Pale Fire
M. T. Vasudevan Nair – Asuravithu
Katherine Anne Porter – Ship of Fools
Zofia Posmysz – Passenger (Pasażerka)
Anthony Powell – The Kindly Ones
Otfried Preußler – Der Räuber Hotzenplotz (The Robber Hotzenplotz)
Reynolds Price – A Long and Happy Life
J. B. Priestley – The Shapes of Sleep
Mary Renault – The Bull from the Sea
Mercè Rodoreda – The Time of the Doves (La plaça del Diamant)
Sankar – Chowringhee
Isaac Bashevis Singer – The Slave
Aleksandr Solzhenitsyn – One Day in the Life of Ivan Denisovich
Fernando Soto Aparicio – La rebelión de las ratas (The Rebellion of the Rats)
Richard Stark (Donald E. Westlake) – The Hunter
Mary Stewart – The Moon-Spinners
Rex Stout
Gambit
Homicide Trinity
Noel Streatfeild – Travelling Shoes (first published as Apple Bough)
Zaim Topčić – Black Snows
Kurt Vonnegut – Mother Night
Irving Wallace – The Prize
Elie Wiesel – Day
David Wilkerson – The Cross and the Switchblade
Herman Wouk – Youngblood Hawke

Children and young people
Joan Aiken – The Wolves of Willoughby Chase
Rev. W. Awdry – Gallant Old Engine (seventeenth in The Railway Series of 42 books by him and his son Christopher Awdry)
Ingri and Edgar Parin d'Aulaire – Book of Greek Myths
Tonke Dragt – De brief voor de Koning (The Letter for the King)
Madeleine L'Engle – A Wrinkle in Time
Penelope Farmer – The Summer Birds
Ezra Jack Keats – The Snowy Day (picture book)
Jean Little – Mine for Keeps
Eloise Jarvis McGraw – The Golden Goblet
Ruth Park – The Muddle-Headed Wombat
Bill Peet – Smokey
Otfried Preußler – The Robber Hotzenplotz
Barbara Sleigh – No One Must Know
Ivan Southall – Hills End
Bernard Waber – The House on East 88th Street (first in the Lyle the Crocodile series)
Stan & Jan Berenstain – The Big Honey Hunt (first in The Berenstain Bears series)

Drama
Edward Albee – Who's Afraid of Virginia Woolf?
Wilberto Cantón – Nosotros somos Dios (We Are God)
Friedrich Dürrenmatt – Die Physiker (The Physicists)
Witold Gombrowicz – Historia
Arthur Kopit – Oh Dad, Poor Dad, Mamma's Hung You in the Closet and I'm Feelin' So Sad
Spike Milligan and John Antrobus – The Bed-Sitting Room
David Rudkin – Afore Night Come
Peter Shaffer – The Private Ear/The Public Eye (double bill)
David Turner – Semi-Detached
 Arthur Watkyn – Out of Bounds

Poetry

Bella Akhmadulina – Struna (The String)
George Oppen – The Materials
Al Purdy – Poems for all the Annettes
William Carlos Williams – Pictures from Brueghel and Other Poems

Non-fiction
Philippe Ariès – L'Enfant et la vie familiale sous l'Ancien Régime (Children and Family Life under the Ancien Régime, translated as Centuries of Childhood, 1962)
W. H. Auden – The Dyer's Hand and other essays
Helen Gurley Brown – Sex and the Single Girl
Rachel Carson – Silent Spring
Thomas B. Costain – The Last Plantagenets (last book in the Pageant of England series)
L. Sprague de Camp – Energy and Power
August Derleth – 100 Books by August Derleth
Milovan Đilas – Conversations with Stalin
Milton Friedman – Capitalism and Freedom
Thomas Kuhn – The Structure of Scientific Revolutions
Dumas Malone – Jefferson and the Ordeal of Liberty
W. Somerset Maugham – Looking Back
V. S. Naipaul – The Middle Passage: Impressions of Five Societies – British, French and Dutch in the West Indies and South America
Louis Nizer – My Life in Court
Russell Page – The Education of a Gardener
Anthony Sampson – Anatomy of Britain
John Steinbeck – Travels With Charley: In Search of America
Percy Thrower – Percy Thrower's Encyclopaedia of Gardening
Barbara Tuchman – The Guns of August

Births
January 17 – Sebastian Junger, American novelist, journalist and documentary film-maker
January 29 – Olga Tokarczuk, Polish fiction writer and poet
February 8 – Malorie Blackman, English writer for young adults and children
February 21
Chuck Palahniuk, American novelist and journalist
David Foster Wallace, American novelist and essayist (died 2008)
March 27 – John O'Farrell, English writer of fiction and non-fiction, comedy scriptwriter and political campaigner
March 30 – Yōko Ogawa (小川 洋子), Japanese novelist and essayist
March 31 – Michal Viewegh, Czech fiction writer
April 2 – Mark Shulman, American children's author
April 6 – Javier Cercas, Spanish novelist and academic
April 13 – Chris Riddell, South African-born English children's book illustrator
April 22 – B. Jeyamohan, Tamil novelist
May 11 - Amir Hamed, Uruguayan writer, essayist and translator (died 2017)
May 12 – Yang Hongying (楊紅櫻), Chinese children's author
May 17 – Lise Lyng Falkenberg, Danish novelist and biographer
May 19 – Jonathan Dee, American novelist
June 12 – Jordan Peterson, Canadian clinical psychologist and writer
July 30 – Lavinia Greenlaw, English poet and novelist
August 3 – Abdo Khal, Saudi Arabian writer
August 10 – Suzanne Collins, American novelist and television writer
August 16 – Christian Cameron, American-born Canadian writer
August 27 – Sjón (Sigurjón Birgir Sigurðsson), Icelandic novelist and poet
September 22 - Nuzo Onoh, British-Nigerian writer
October 11 – Anne Enright, Irish novelist
October 19 – Tracy Chevalier, American historical novelist
October 28 – Mark Haddon, English novelist and poet
November 4 - Rick Yancey, American young-adult writer
November 12
Neal Shusterman, American children's author and poet
Naomi Wolf, American writer and activist
December 17 – Jan Bondeson, Swedish non-fiction writer

Deaths
January 17 – Gerrit Achterberg, Dutch poet (heart attack, born 1905)
January 20 – Robinson Jeffers, American poet (born 1887)
January 24 – Ahmet Hamdi Tanpınar, Turkish novelist and essayist (born 1901)
February 16 – Frank Prewett, Canadian poet (born 1893)
February 24 – Hu Shih (胡適), Chinese Nobel Prize-winning philosopher and language reformer (born 1891)
March 3 – Pierre Benoit, French novelist (born 1886)
March 16 – Dora Adele Shoemaker, American poet, playwright, educator (born 1873)
March 20 – C. Wright Mills, American sociologist (born 1916)
April or May – Constantin Gane, Romanian biographer and historical novelist (born 1885)
April 1 – Michel de Ghelderode, Belgian playwright (born 1898)
April 24 – Emilio Prados, Spanish poet and editor (born 1899)
May 3 — Helen Dortch Longstreet, American social advocate, librarian, and newspaper woman (born 1863)
May 24 – E. M. W. Tillyard, English literary scholar (born 1889)
May 26 – Wilfrid Wilson Gibson, English poet (born 1878)
June 2 – Vita Sackville-West, English poet and gardener (born 1892)
June 27 – Paul Viiding, Estonian poet and critic (born 1904)
July 6 – William Faulkner, American novelist and Nobel laureate (born 1897)
July 8 – Georges Bataille, French writer (cerebral arteriosclerosis, born 1897)
July 21 – G. M. Trevelyan, English historian (born 1876)
July 27 – Richard Aldington, English poet and novelist (born 1892)
August 9 – Hermann Hesse, German-born Swiss novelist, poet and painter (born 1877)
September 3 – E. E. Cummings, American poet (born 1894)
September 21 – Ouyang Yuqian (欧阳予倩), Chinese dramatist (born 1889)
September 22 – Jean-René Huguenin, French novelist and literary critic (born in 1936)
September 23 – Patrick Hamilton, English dramatist (liver and kidney failure, born 1904)
November 17 – Sandu Tudor, Romanian poet, journalist and theologian (stroke and possibly torture, born 1896)
December 3 – Dame Mary Gilmore, Australian poet and journalist (born 1865)
December 12 – Felix Aderca, Romanian novelist, critic, poet and journalist (cancer, born 1891)
December 18 – Garrett Mattingly, American historian (born 1900)
December – Ethel Carnie Holdsworth, English working class novelist and campaigner (born 1886)

Awards
American Academy of Arts and Letters Gold Medal for Fiction: William Faulkner
Carnegie Medal for children's literature: Pauline Clarke, The Twelve and the Genii
Eric Gregory Award: Donald Thomas, James Simmons, Brian Johnson, Jenny Joseph
James Tait Black Memorial Prize for fiction: Ronald Hardy, Act of Destruction
James Tait Black Memorial Prize for biography: Meriol Trevor, Newman: The Pillar and the Cloud and Newman: Light in Winter
Miles Franklin Award: Thea Astley, The Well Dressed Explorer and George Turner, The Cupboard Under the Stairs
Newbery Medal for children's literature: Elizabeth George Speare, The Bronze Bow
Newdigate Prize: Stanley Johnson
Nobel Prize for Literature: John Steinbeck
Premio Nadal: José María Mendiola, Muerte por fusilamiento
Pulitzer Prize for Drama: Frank Loesser, Abe Burrows, How To Succeed In Business Without Really Trying
Pulitzer Prize for Fiction: Edwin O'Connor, The Edge of Sadness
Pulitzer Prize for Poetry: Alan Dugan, Poems
Queen's Gold Medal for Poetry: Christopher Fry

References

 
Years of the 20th century in literature